Rambaiyin Kaadhal may refer to:
 Rambaiyin Kaadhal (1939 film), an Indian Tamil-language Hindu mythological film
 Rambaiyin Kaadhal (1956 film), an Indian Tamil-language Hindu mythological film